Dollar Cravings (or $1 Dollar Cravings) is the value menu of American fast-food restaurant Taco Bell. Dollar Cravings was launched August 18, 2014 in reaction to the new McDonald's and Wendy's value/dollar menus. The current menu contains 13 food items. Dollar Cravings replaced Taco Bell's previous value menu Why Pay More. A Taco Bell spokesperson said few of the food items from the Why Pay More menu will remain in Dollar Cravings.

On March 10, 2016, Taco Bell introduced a breakfast value menu.

History 
On 26 December 2012, fast food culture site Brand Eating reported Taco Bell planned to replace their value menu Why Pay More with Dollar Cravings. Brand Eating speculated Dollar Cravings was "probably a response to rising food and labor costs." The value menu was tested in select locations in southern California, Kansas City, and Sacramento.

Cost 
The pricing of the Dollar Cravings food items was largely determined by the competition from other fast-food restaurants like McDonald's and Wendy's. Magazine Time pointed out the increase in price from 99¢ to a dollar. Television channel CNBC also noted the price increased from the previous value menu Why Pay More which had a three-tiered menu offering food items from 79, 89, or 99 cents.

Menu 
The menu was divided based on five food cravings: "Beefy", "Cheesy", "Crunchy", "Spicy", and "Sweet".

Food items on the Dollar Cravings menu include:

Promotion 
On August 15, 2014, the new menu was advertised via the mobile application SnapChat with the target demographic being millennials.

Everlasting Dollars 
On August 26, 2014, Taco Bell announced the new contest "Everlasting Dollars" in which 11 participants in 11 American cities could win a lifetime of Taco Bell food. However, The Consumerist points out the fine print:

The A.V. Club proved critical of "Everlasting Dollars" stating "In an unflinchingly honest appraisal, Taco Bell caps a 'lifetime' of eating its food at just 46 years. And in that time, you’ll be awarded only $10,000 in gift cards—and this doled out at just $216 per year. While obviously the most humane solution, giving contestants just over $4 to spend on Taco Bell per week is hardly the 'lifetime' of eating Taco Bell you might have imagined. It is as though Taco Bell has promised you a delicious, fulfilling prize, only to totally cheap out on what’s inside."

Reception

Commercial 
A writer for Seeking Alpha said that the new menu "could improve same store sales and once again increase the overall value of owning a Taco Bell chain." Canadian Internet news service Digital Journal considered the new menu "a strategy to attract the youth, who had cut down quick-service restaurant visits in the past few years due to low-disposable income amid the sluggishly recovering economy."

Food 
AdWeeks David Griner tried every food item on the menu. On the subject of the Cheesy Roll-Up, Griner called it "the toast sandwich of Taco Bell cuisine." E!s Julia Hays reviewed the menu favorably stating "[w]e'll take as many Triple Layer Nachos as we can carry." Newspaper Investor's Business Daily described Dollar Cravings as "cheese-and-carb-heavy." Thrillist Media Groups Lee Breslouer had cannabis enthusiast "Jim" try every item on the menu. His ranking placed the items in the order of Triple Layer Nachos, Spicy Tostada, Shredded Chicken Mini Quesadilla, Cheese Roll-Up, Spicy Potato Soft Taco, Cheesy Bean and Rice Burrito, Beefy Mini Quesadilla, Caramel Apple Empanada, Cinnamon Twists, Beefy Fritos Burrito, and Cinnabon Delights.

See also 
Burger Wars

References

External links 

Restaurant menus
Taco Bell
Fast food